Madison is a town located in Rockingham County, North Carolina.  At the 2020 census, the town had a total population of 2,132. Madison is part of the Greensboro-High Point Metropolitan Statistical Area of the Piedmont Triad metro region. It was home to the corporate headquarters of Remington Arms until 2020, when the company was made defunct by bankruptcy proceedings. It is still home to Marlin Firearms, which was an asset of Remington now owned by Sturm, Ruger & Co.

History
In 1940 artist Jean Watson painted the mural, Early Summer in North Carolina, in the town's post office as a project commissioned by the Works Progress Administration.

The Academy Street Historic District, The Boxwoods, Cross Rock Rapid Sluice, Fewell-Reynolds House, Gravel Shoals Sluice, Jacob's Creek Landing, Mayo River Sluice, Roberson's Fish Trap Shoal Sluice, Alfred Moore Scales Law Office, and Slink Shoal Sluice and Wing Dams are listed on the National Register of Historic Places. The Boxley House, in downtown Madison, is the oldest standing structure in the town.

Schools
Preschools: Western Rockingham Preschool/Daycare.
 
Elementary Schools: Dillard Elementary School, New Vision Elementary School, Huntsville Elementary School.

Middle School: Western Rockingham Middle School.

High School (in Mayodan, NC): Dalton L. McMichael High School.

Geography 
Madison is located at 36°23'13" North, 79°58'9" West (36.386818, -79.969276).

Demographics

2020 census

As of the 2020 United States census, there were 2,129 people, 995 households, and 595 families residing in the town.

2000 census
At the census of 2000, there were 2,262 people, 972 households, and 626 families in the town.  The population density was 686.5 people per square mile (265.5/km).  There were 1,056 housing units at an average density of 320.5 per square mile (123.9/km).  The racial makeup of the town was 97.32% White, 1.54% African American, 0.31% Native American, 0.35% Asian, 0.13% Pacific Islander, 0.59% from other races, and 0.75% from two or more races.  1.41% of the population were Hispanic or Latino of any race.

Of the 972 households 25.5% had children under the age of 18 living with them, 45.3% were married couples living together, 15.5% had a female householder with no husband present, and 35.5% were non-families. 31.5% of households were one person and 16.5% had someone living alone who was 65 or older.  The average household size was 2.33 and the average family size was 2.92.

The age distribution was 22.2% under the age of 18, 7.7% from 18 to 24, 27.0% from 25 to 44, 24.8% from 45 to 64, and 18.3% 65 or older.  The median age was 40 years.  For every 100 females, there were 88.2 males.  For every 100 females age 18 and over, there were 83.7 males.

The median household income was $38,955 and the median family income  was $36,429. Males had a median income of $32,109 and females $21,379. The per capita income for the town was $19,494.  10.5% of the population and 8.2% of families were below the poverty line.  Out of the total population, 14.5% of those under the age of 18 and 2.7% of those 65 and older were living below the poverty line.

Notable people 
Notable natives and residents of Madison include:
 Linda Carter Brinson (born 1948) - editor and writer
 Benny Carter (1943–2014) - painter, grew up in Madison
 J. P. Carter (1915–2000) - politician and military officer, served as Mayor of Madison
 Maryhelen Mayfield (born 1946) - ballet dancer and arts administrator

References

External links
 Official website of Madison, NC

Towns in Rockingham County, North Carolina
Towns in North Carolina